Nenad Vučinić (born 7 April 1965) is a Serbian-New Zealand basketball coach and former player. He once served as the interim head coach for Philippines men's national basketball team, with Chot Reyes replacing him in the following 2022 FIBA Asia Cup.

Playing career 
As a player, he grew with youth selections of Partizan Belgrade. He played for BASK, Radnički, Kolubara and Slavonka Osijek before flying to New Zealand in 1989 with his wife. There he played for the Nelson Giants of the New Zealand NBL. As a player, Vučinić was voted to the NBL All-Star Five in 1990.

Coaching career 
He is the former head coach of New Zealand men's national basketball team the Tall Blacks. He was also the head coach for Fulgor Libertas Forlì in the Italian second league (Legadue), and for BC Kalev/Cramo, a professional basketball club based in Tallinn, Estonia which participates in Korvpalli Meistriliiga, Baltic Basketball League and VTB United League.

He has won five NBL Coach of the Year titles while guiding Nelson to two titles in 1998 and 2007. He stood down as Giants coach after their most recent success and still holds the record for most NBL coaching wins (164). After six years as an assistant coach, he took over the Tall Blacks reins in 2007, taking them to victory over Australia in the 2009 FIBA Oceania Championship and into the last 16 at the 2010 FIBA World Championship.

On 12 June 2018, Vučinić signed a two-year deal with the Italian basketball club Sidigas Avellino of Lega Basket Serie A (LBA). On 10 April 2019 he parted ways with Sidigas Avellino.

In early 2022, Vučinić joined the Philippines men's national basketball team initially as a consultant to head coach Tab Baldwin who resigned shortly after. He would continue working under Chot Reyes. Vučinić would temporarily serve as head coach of the team for the June–July 2022 window of the 2023 FIBA Basketball World Cup Asian qualifiers. After the brief stint, he became an assistant coach to Reyes who reassumed the position of head coach. In August 2022, Vučinić left the Philippine national team coaching staff. The Samahang Basketbol ng Pilipinas, the national federation of the Philippines, released a statement that Vučinić left the team amicably.

References

External links
 
 1999 Nelson Giants coach profile

1965 births
Living people
Basketball players at the 2000 Summer Olympics
Basketball players from Belgrade
BC Kalev/Cramo coaches
BKK Radnički players
KK BASK players
KK Kolubara players
Kumamoto Volters coaches
Nelson Giants players
New Zealand basketball coaches
New Zealand men's basketball players
New Zealand people of Serbian descent
OKK Beograd coaches
Olympic basketball players of New Zealand
Serbian expatriate basketball people in China
Serbian expatriate basketball people in Croatia
Serbian expatriate basketball people in Estonia
Serbian expatriate basketball people in Italy
Serbian expatriate basketball people in Japan
Serbian expatriate basketball people in Lebanon
Serbian emigrants to New Zealand
Serbian expatriate basketball people in Turkey
Serbian men's basketball coaches
Serbian men's basketball players
Small forwards
Yugoslav men's basketball players
Serbian expatriate basketball people in the Philippines
New Zealand expatriate basketball people in the Philippines